Matías Vargas may refer to:

 Matías Vargas (footballer, born 1996), Argentine forward
 Matías Vargas (footballer, born 1997), Argentine midfielder